Klondike may refer to:

Place names

Canada
 Klondike, Yukon, a region in the Yukon
 Klondike (electoral district), a district of the Legislative Assembly of Yukon
 Klondike Highway, connecting Skagway, Alaska to Dawson City, Yukon
 Klondike Hills, a mountain range near the Klondike River
 Klondike River, the landmark after which is named:
 Klondike Gold Rush, a historical migration to this part of the Yukon
 Klondike Gold Rush National Historical Park
 North Klondike River, a tributary of the Klondike River

United States
Klondike, DeKalb County, Georgia
Klondike, Hall County, Georgia
Klondike, Illinois
Klondike, Indiana
Klondike, Maryland
Klondike, Louisville, Kentucky
Klondike, Missouri
Klondike, Oregon
Klondike, Pennsylvania
Klondike, Dawson County, Texas
Klondike, Delta County, Texas
Klondike, West Virginia
Klondike, Kenosha County, Wisconsin
Klondike, Oconto County, Wisconsin
Klondike Glacier, in Shoshone National Forest, Wyoming
Klondike Park (St. Charles County), in St. Charles County, Missouri

Arts, entertainment and media

Games
Klondike (board game)
Klondike (solitaire), a popular solitaire card game

Television
Klondike (miniseries), a 2014 Discovery Channel miniseries
Klondike (TV series), a 1960-1961 television series on NBC
An Klondike, a 2015 four-part TV series in both Irish and English

Other uses in arts, entertainment, and media
Klondike (1932 film), an American film directed by Phil Rosen
Klondike (2022 film), a Ukrainian film 
Klondike Kat, a cartoon
 555 (telephone number) (Klondike 5), the fictional telephone number prefix

Brands and enterprises
Klondike bar, a frozen confection consisting of an ice cream square coated in chocolate
Klondike Hotel and Casino, a hotel and casino in Las Vegas
Klondike Pete, a cartoon character created to promote the breakfast cereal Golden Nuggets

Sports
Klondike, the name for Ohio Northern University's mascot
Klondike derby, a winter competition event for Boy Scouts
Klondike Open, a darts tournament in Edmonton, Alberta, Canada

Other uses
Klondike (boxer), an African American boxer
SS Klondike and SS Klondike II, two sternwheelers that carried freight on the Yukon River

See also
Clondalkin
Klendike, Kansas
Klondyke (disambiguation)